Edward Ward, 4th Viscount Bangor DL (23 February 1827 – 14 September 1881), styled The Honourable from September 1827 until 1837, was an Irish peer and Conservative politician.

Born in London, he was the son of Edward Ward, 3rd Viscount Bangor and his wife Harriet Margaret Maxwell, second daughter of Henry Maxwell, 6th Baron Farnham. In 1837, aged only ten, Ward succeeded his father as viscount. He was educated at Eton College and went then to Trinity College, Cambridge. He served as Deputy Lieutenant for County Down and in 1855, Ward was elected a representative peer to the House of Lords. Ward died at Brighton, unmarried but was rumoured to have had an out-of-wedlock son born in 1856 named Edward Terry Ward. He was succeeded in the viscountcy by his younger brother Henry.

References

1827 births
1881 deaths
Alumni of Trinity College, Cambridge
Deputy Lieutenants of Down
Irish representative peers
People educated at Eton College
Edward
Edward 4